The 2006 edition of the men's UCI Road World Championships Road Race took place on September 24, 2006, in the Austrian city of Salzburg. Reigning Olympic champion and Italian Paolo Bettini captured the gold medal and the rainbow jersey as the 2006 World Cycling Champion. The 36-year-old German sprinter Erik Zabel took the silver medal and UCI ProTour winner Alejandro Valverde of Spain captured third place for the bronze medal. A total of 136 cyclists actually finished the race, with Slovakia's Roman Broniš in last place (+ 13'38").

Final classification

Selected riders

Based on the results of the riders in the UCI ProTour and UCI Continental Circuits in 2006, all nations have received a number of riders they can send to the championships. The number of allowed riders is different for each continent:
Qualified Nations by the UCI Protour: Australia, Belgium, France, Germany, Italy, Netherlands, Russia, Spain and Switzerland get 9 starters. Canada, Finland, Hungary, Lithuania and Luxembourg get 1 starter.
Qualified Nations by the UCI Africa Tour: South Africa gets 6 starters. Burkina Faso gets 3 starters.
Qualified Nations by the UCI America Tour: Brazil and Colombia get 6 starters. Argentina, Mexico and Venezuela get 3 starters. Costa Rica and Cuba get 1 starter.
Qualified Nations by the UCI Asia Tour: Iran gets 6 starters. Kazakhstan and Japan get 3 starters.
Qualified Nations by the UCI European Tour: Czech Republic, Poland, Portugal, Slovenia, Slovakia and Ukraine get 6 starters. Austria, Belarus, Bulgaria, Croatia, Denmark, Estonia, Great Britain, Ireland, Latvia and Norway get 3 starters. Sweden gets 1 starter. Note: Because Austria is the host nation, they are given 3 extra starters to give them 6 riders in total.
Qualified Nations by the UCI Oceania Tour: New Zealand gets 3 starters.

All nations are allowed to select reserves too, 5 reserves for nations with 9 riders, 3 reserves for nations with 6 riders, 2 reserves for nations with 3 riders and 1 reserve for nations with 1 rider.

Nations allowed nine riders

Australia
On September 14, the selection was released:
Cadel Evans, 
Nick Gates, 
Simon Gerrans, 
Mathew Hayman, 
Robbie McEwen, 
Bradley McGee, 
Stuart O'Grady, 
Michael Rogers, 
Matthew White,

Belgium
National Coach: Carlo Bomans

On September 11, the selection was released:
Serge Baguet, 
Tom Boonen, 
Stijn Devolder, 
Philippe Gilbert, 
Leif Hoste, 
Kevin Hulsmans, 
Nick Nuyens, 
Jurgen Van Goolen, 

Also 5 reserves were appointed:
Björn Leukemans, 
Thierry Marichal, 
Kevin van Impe, 
Geert Verheyen, 
Frederik Willems,

France
Selection released on September 12:
Sylvain Calzati, 
Sylvain Chavanel, 
Cyril Dessel, 
Samuel Dumoulin, 
Anthony Geslin, 
Sébastien Hinault, 
Sébastien Joly, 
Christophe Le Mével, 
Thomas Voeckler,

Germany
On September 11, the first selection was released, but since then many things have changed. Matthias Kessler and Jens Voigt have refused their selection as they claim to be "too tired after a long tiring season". Andreas Klöden has declared he only wants to ride in the
Time Trial World Championships 2006.

Current Selection:
Linus Gerdemann, 
Christian Knees, 
Ronny Scholz, 
Stephan Schreck, 
Stefan Schumacher, 
Marcel Sieberg, Team Wiesenhof
Patrik Sinkewitz, 
Fabian Wegmann, 
Erik Zabel,

Italy
National coach Franco Ballerini selected the following riders:

Alessandro Ballan, 
Paolo Bettini, 
Marzio Bruseghin, 
Danilo Di Luca, 
Rinaldo Nocentini, 
Luca Paolini, 
Filippo Pozzato, 
Davide Rebellin, 
Matteo Tosatto,

Netherlands
National coach Egon van Kessel selected the following riders:
Michael Boogerd, 
Jan Boven, 
Bram de Groot, 
Karsten Kroon, 
Gerben Löwik, 
Joost Posthuma, 
Bram Tankink, 
Maarten Tjallingii, 
Max van Heeswijk,

Russia
Alexander Arekeev, 
Alexandre Bazhenov, Naturino–Sapore di Mare
Alexander Bocharov, 
Alexander Efimkin, 
Vladimir Efimkin, 
Vladimir Gusev, 
Vladimir Karpets, 
Alexandr Kolobnev, 
Alexei Markov,

Spain
Íñigo Cuesta, 
Juan Antonio Flecha, 
Xavier Florencio, 
Luis Pérez Rodríguez, 
Joaquim Rodríguez, 
Samuel Sánchez, 
Alejandro Valverde, 
Francisco Ventoso, 
Carlos Sastre,

Switzerland
Selection released on September 14:
Michael Albasini, 
Fabian Cancellara, 
Aurélien Clerc, 
Martin Elmiger, 
David Loosli, 
Grégory Rast, 
Steffen Wesemann, 
Oliver Zaugg, 
Beat Zberg,

United States
Chris Baldwin, 
Tyler Farrar, 
Chris Horner, 
Jason McCartney, 
Danny Pate, 
Fred Rodriguez, 
Jackson Stewart, Kodakgallery.com–Sierra Nevada Pro Cycling
Guido Trenti, 
Christian Vande Velde,

Nations allowed six riders

Austria
The home nation was represented by:
Bernhard Eisel, 
René Haselbacher, 
Bernhard Kohl, 
Christian Pfannberger, 
Georg Totschnig, 
Peter Wrolich,

Brazil
Murilo Fischer, Naturino–Sapore di Mare
Soelito Gohr, Scott–Marcondes Cesar–São José dos Campos
Márcio May, Scott/Marcondes
Pedro Nicacio, Scott–Marcondes Cesar–São José dos Campos
Luciano Pagliarini,

Colombia
Mauricio Ardila, 
Alex Caño, Unknown
Félix Cárdenas, 
Luis Felipe Laverde, Ceramica Panaria–Navigare
Marlon Pérez Arango, Team Tenax Salmilano
Mauricio Soler,

Czech Republic
Petr Benčík, 
Tomáš Bucháček, 
Stanislav Kozubek, 
Roman Kreuziger, 
Martin Mareš, Naturino–Sapore di Mare
František Raboň,

Poland
Tomasz Kiendyś, Knauf Team
Tomasz Marczyński, Ceramica Flaminia
Przemysław Niemiec, Miche
Robert Radosz, DHL–Author
Marek Rutkiewicz, Intel–Action
Kristzof Szczawinski, Ceramica Flaminia

Portugal
Bruno Neves, Madeinox–BRIC–AR Canelas
Sérgio Paulinho, 
Nuno Ribeiro, LA Aluminios–Liberty Seguros
José Rodrigues, Carvalhelhos–Boavista
Rui Sousa, LA Aluminios–Liberty Seguros
Nelson Victorino, Duja–Tavira

Slovenia
Janez Brajkovič, 
Borut Božič, Perutnina Ptuj
Matej Mugerli, 
Uroš Murn, 
Gorazd Štangelj, 
Tadej Valjavec,

Slovakia
Roman Broniš, Dukla Trenčín
Matej Jurčo, 
Maroš Kováč, Dukla Trenčín
Martin Prázdnovský, Team Sparebanken Vest
Martin Riška, 
Ján Valach, Aposport Krone Linz

South Africa
Ryan Cox, 
David George, Relax
Robert Hunter, 
Tiaan Kannemeyer, 
Darren Lill, Schwinn
Ian McLeod,

Ukraine
Andriy Hryvko, 
Ruslan Pidgornyy, Tenax Nobili Rubinetterie
Yaroslav Popovych, 
Kyrylo Pospeyev, 
Volodymyr Starchyk, Mykolaiv
Volodymyr Zagorodniy, S. C. Pagnoncelli-NGC-Perrel

Nations allowed three riders

Argentina
Gerardo Fernández, Viña Magna–Cropu
Jorge Martín Montenegro, Unknown

Belarus
Aliaksandr Kuscynski, Ceramica Flaminia
Kanstantsin Sivtsov, 
Alexander Usov,

Bulgaria
Daniel Andonov Petrov, Maia Milaneza
Daniel Petrov, Duja–Tavira
Svetoslav Tchanliev, Unknown

Burkina Faso
 Rabaki Jérémie Ouédraogo, Unknown
 Abdul Wahab Sawadogo, Unknown
 Saïdou Rouamba, Unknown

Croatia
Matija Kvasina, Perutnina Ptuj
Hrvoje Miholjević, Perutnina Ptuj
Radoslav Rogina, Perutnina Ptuj

Denmark
Lars Bak, 
Jakob Piil, 
Nicki Sørensen,

Estonia
Mart Ojavee, Kalev Chocolate Team
Erki Pütsep, 
Tarmo Raudsepp, Union Cycliste Nantes Atlantique

Great Britain
Russell Downing, DFL–Cyclingnews–Litespeed
Roger Hammond, 
David Millar,

Ireland
David McCann, Giant Asia Racing Team
Nicolas Roche, 
Philip Deignan,

Japan
Fumiyuki Beppu, 
Shinichi Fukushima, Cycle Racing Team Vang
Hidenori Nodera,

Kazakhstan
Andrey Kashechkin, 
Alexander Vinokourov, 
Sergei Yakovlev,

Latvia
Raivis Belohvoščiks, C.B. Immobiliare–Universal Caffé
Aleksejs Saramotins, Rietumu Banka–Riga

New Zealand
New Zealand chose not to send riders to the Road World Championships 2006, as their most important riders are injured and thus unavailable.

Norway
Kurt Asle Arvesen, 
Thor Hushovd, 
Gabriel Rasch, Team Maxbo Bianchi

Venezuela
Manuel Medina, Alcaldia de Cabimas
José Ramos, Alcaldia de Cabimas
José Rujano,

Nations allowed one rider

Canada
Ryder Hesjedal,

Finland
Kjell Carlström,

Hungary
László Bodrogi,

Lithuania
Dainius Kairelis, Amore & Vita–McDonald's

Luxembourg
Fränk Schleck,

Sweden
Marcus Ljungqvist,

References
cyclingnews

External links
Race website

UCI Road World Championships – Men's road race
Men's Road Race

de:Straßen-Radweltmeisterschaft 2006